"The Blackwell Story" was an American television film broadcast live on February 28, 1957, as part of the CBS television series, Playhouse 90. It was the 22nd episode of the first season of Playhouse 90. Joanne Dru played the role of Elizabeth Blackwell.

Plot
The play examines the life of Elizabeth Blackwell who became America's first woman doctor in 1849.

Cast
 Joanne Dru as Elizabeth Blackwell
 Dan O'Herlihy as Dr. Keller
 Charles Korvin as Dr. Von Neff
 Marshall Thompson as David
 Keith Larsen as Howard
 Wilton Graff as Samuel Blackwell
 Philip Tonge as Dean Parkington
 Paul Keast as Dean Robertson
 Damian O'Flynn as Dr. McKay
 Joanna Barnes as Ellen Blackwell
 Harvey Stephens as Dr. Adams

Frank Lovejoy hosted the show.

Production
The film was produced by Screen Gems for Playhouse 90. It was Screen Gems' fifth production for the series.

Eva Wolas was the producer, and James Neilson was the director. Mel Barr wrote the teleplay based on an unproduced script ("The First Woman Doctor") by Lloyd C. Douglas. Gert Andersen was the director of photography.

Reception
Walter Ames in the Los Angeles Times called it a "TV triumph" and praised Dru's "sterling performance".

In the New York Daily News, Ben Gross called it an "interesting play" and praised Dru for "an appealing and forceful portrayal."

References

1957 television plays
Playhouse 90 (season 1) episodes
1957 American television episodes